Donsdale is a residential neighbourhood in west Edmonton, Alberta, Canada.

Donsdale is a newer neighbourhood (Except several older homes built along North Saskatchewan River). According to the 2001 federal census, all residential construction in the neighbourhood occurred after 1995.

According to the 2005 municipal census, all of the residences in the neighbourhood are single-family dwellings.  Substantially all (99%) of the residences are owner-occupied with only 1% being rented.

The neighbourhood is bounded on the north west by Lessard Road, on the south west by 184 Street.  The north east boundary is located half a block south west of 53 Avenue. To the east the neighbourhood overlooks the North Saskatchewan River valley and to the south it overlooks a ravine.

Demographics 

Surrounding neighbourhoods

References

External links 
 Donsdale Neighbourhood Profile

Neighbourhoods in Edmonton